Guntheuc (or Gondioque) (495 – c. 532) was the queen of Orléans and wife of Chlodomer, king of Orléans. She later married his brother Chlothar I, king of Soissons.

Biographical information
Guntheuc may have been of Burgundian origin and the granddaughter of Godegisel a King of Burgundy. 
She is briefly mentioned in Gregory of Tours' History of the Franks.
In 517 she married Chlodomer, king of Orléans. They are likely the parents of Gunthar, Theudebald, and Clodoald (later canonised Saint Cloud).

King Chlodomer led an expedition against the Burgundians in 524. He was killed on this expedition, in the spring or summer of the same year, at the Battle of Vézeronce. His three sons were entrusted to his mother Clotilde until his widow married Clotaire I. Clotaire, however, had Chlodomer's children killed, although Clodoald managed to escape. Better known as Saint Cloud, he later became abbot of Nogent, having given up his hair, the symbol of the Frankish royalty, rather than giving up his life.

After Chlodomer's death, Guntheuc married his brother Clothar I, king of Soissons. Chlothar's marriage to Guntheuc gave Chlothar access to Chlodomer's treasury and ensured the rights of Guntheuc as sole heiress of King Godégisile's lands; as Frankish law allowed a woman to inherit land if she had no sons.

References

Frankish queens consort
Remarried royal consorts
495 births
530s deaths
Year of death uncertain
Merovingian dynasty
6th-century Frankish nobility
6th-century Frankish women